The Ulster Senior Club Hurling Championship (known for sponsorship reasons as the AIB Ulster GAA Hurling Senior Club Championship) is an annual hurling competition organised by the Ulster Council of the Gaelic Athletic Association and contested by the champion hurling teams in the province of Ulster in Ireland. It is the most prestigious club competition in Ulster hurling.

Introduced in 1970, it was initially a straight knockout tournament open to the nine county club champion teams in Ulster. The competition currently retains the knockout format but features just four teams who represent the strongest hurling counties in Ulster.

In its current format, the Ulster Club Championship begins in October with the semi-finals. Entrants are not seeded. The two semi-final winners proceed to the final which is currently played in late October or early November. The winner of the Ulster Club Championship, as well as being presented with the Four Seasons Cup, qualifies for the subsequent All-Ireland Club Championship.

The competition has been won by 10 teams, 8 of which have won it more than once. Ruairí Óg, Cushendall is the most successful team in the tournament's history, having won it 11 times. Dunloy are the reigning champions, having beaten Slaughtneil by 2-12 to 0-16 in the final.

Teams

Qualification

Finals by year

 The winners are listed in bold if they also won the All-Ireland Senior Club Hurling Championship.

Roll of honour

By county

By club

Records and statistics

Teams

By decade

The most successful team of each decade, judged by number of Ulster Championship titles, is as follows:

 1970s: 2 each for Loughgiel Shamrocks (1970–71), O'Donovan Rossa (1972–77), Ballycran (1974–76), Ballycastle McQuillan (1978–79)
 1980s: 4 for Ballycastle McQuillan (1980-83-84-86)
 1990s: 4 each for Dunloy (1990-94-95-97) and Ruairí Óg (1991-92-96-99)
 2000s: 6 for Dunloy (2000-01-02-03-07-09)
 2010s: 4 for Loughgiel Shamrocks (2010-11-12-13)

Gaps

Top five longest gaps between successive championship titles:
 23 years: Ballygalget (1975-1998)
 21 years: Loughgiel Shamrocks (1989-2010)
 17 years: Ballycran (1976-1993)
 16 years: O'Donovan Rossa (1988-2004)
 11 years: O'Donovan Rossa (1977-1988)

Top scorers

By year

In finals

References

1